Eremias nigrocellata (commonly known as the black-ocellated racerunner) is a species of lizard found in Turkmenistan, Uzbekistan, Tadzhikistan, Iran, and Afghanistan.

References

Eremias
Reptiles described in 1896
Fauna of the Middle East
Taxa named by Alexander Nikolsky